C17 is an untarred road in the eastern part of ǁKaras Region in Namibia. It starts at the C15 and Auob River at Mata Mata, a couple of kilometers inside of Hardap Region before ending  later in Keetmanshoop.

Roads in Namibia
Buildings and structures in Hardap Region
Buildings and structures in ǁKaras Region